Market Square Park is a public park in Downtown Houston, Texas, United States.  It is bounded by Travis, Milam, Congress and Preston streets. It has remained a geographic centerpiece of Downtown Houston since the arrival of the city's founders, John Kirby and Augustus Chapman Allen in 1836.

The square was donated to the city in 1854 by Augustus Allen and used as an open air produce market. Very near Allen's Landing, the original port of Houston, the downtown business district grew around the square. Early city landmarks included the briefly used Texas Capitol and White House. In addition, several City Halls rose and fell at Market Square, each destroyed by fire.

The historic square is surrounded by 19th century architecture, housing a variety of businesses, entertainment venues, nightclubs and dining establishments. Market Square is located directly between Allen's Landing and the Theater District.

It is a central feature of the Main Street/Market Square Historic District, a historic district listed on the National Register of Historic Places.

Lauren’s Garden

Former Houston-area resident, Lauren Catuzzi Grandolas, was killed on board United Airlines Flight 93 during the  September 11 attacks. A memorial bust figure of her is positioned next to a water feature and plaque created in her honor at the Congress Street side of the park.

Gallery

See also
 Points of View by James Surls, installed in the park

References

External links

Market Square Historic District
Lauren Griffith Associates

Parks in Houston
1854 establishments in Texas
Protected areas established in 1854
Downtown Houston